Phunoi (Sinsali) is a Loloish language (or languages) of northern Laos. Dialects are divergent and may be distinct languages; these are Black Khoany, White Khoany, Mung, Hwethom, Khaskhong. Bradley cites six languages within Phunoi.

In Phongsaly Province, Phunoi is spoken in Phongxaly District and Bun Tay District (including in Langne Village) (Kingsada 1999).

References

Further reading
Boute, Vanina. 2010. Names and Territoriality among the Phounoy: How the State creates Ethnic Group (Lao PDR), in C. Culas et F. Robinne (eds.), Inter-Ethnic Dynamics in Asia. Considering the Other through ethnonyms, territories and rituals, London: Routledge, pp. 79–99.
Kingsadā, Thō̜ngphet, and Tadahiko Shintani. 1999. Basic Vocabularies of the Languages Spoken in Phongxaly, Lao P.D.R. Tokyo: Institute for the Study of Languages and Cultures of Asia and Africa (ILCAA).
Kingsada, Thongpheth. 2002. Languages and Ethnic Classification in the Lao PDR. International Workshop on the "Cultural Diversity and Conservation in the making of Mainland Southeast Asia and Southwestern China: Regional Dynamics in Past and Present". Luang Prabang, Lao P.D.R.
Dai Qingxia. 2018. The Punei language of Laos [Laowo Puneiyu yanjiu 老挝普内语研究]. Beijing: Science Press 科学出版社. 

Southern Loloish languages
Languages of Laos